Climate and Development is a peer-reviewed interdisciplinary scientific journal covering issues that arise due to climate change, climate variability, and climate policy along with development needs, impacts and priorities. It was established in 2009 and is published by Taylor and Francis. The Editors-in-Chief are E. Lisa F. Schipper (University of Bonn) and Jonathan Ensor (Stockholm Environment Institute) (since October 2018). The founding editor-in-chief was Richard J.T. Klein (Stockholm Environment Institute).

Abstracting and indexing
The journal is abstracted and indexed in:
CAB Abstracts
Current Contents/Social & Behavioral Sciences
EBSCO databases
GEOBASE
Scopus
Social Sciences Citation Index
According to the Journal Citation Reports, the journal has a 2020 impact factor of 4.280.

References

External links

Routledge academic journals
Climatology journals
Development studies journals
Publications established in 2009
English-language journals
7 times per year journals